Laurence Alexander Glenn (August 25, 1900 – January 26, 1985) was an American prelate of the Roman Catholic Church.  He served as an auxiliary bishop of the Diocese of Duluth in Minnesota between 1956 and 1960 and bishop of the Diocese of Crookston, in Minnesota from 1960 to 1970.

Biography 
Lawrence Glenn was born in Bellingham, Washington, on August 25, 1900. He was ordained a priest on June 11, 1927. On July 13, 1956, he was appointed auxiliary bishop of the Diocese of Duluth.  On September 12, 1956, Glenn received his episcopal consecration.

On June 27, 1960, Glenn was appointed as the fourth bishop of the Crookston Diocese by Pope John XXIII. On July 24, 1970, Pope Paul VI accepted Glenn's resignation as bishop of Crookston. Lawrence Glenn died on January 26, 1985, at age 84.

References

1900 births
1985 deaths
People from Bellingham, Washington
People from Duluth, Minnesota
Roman Catholic Diocese of Duluth
Roman Catholic bishops of Crookston
20th-century Roman Catholic bishops in the United States
Participants in the Second Vatican Council
Catholics from Washington (state)